Gunnera manicata, known as Brazilian giant-rhubarb or giant rhubarb, is a species of flowering plant in the family Gunneraceae from the coastal Serra do Mar Mountains of  Santa Catarina, Parana and Rio Grande do Sul States, Brazil.

The leaves of G. manicata grow to an impressive size. The underside of the leaf and the whole stalk have spikes on them. In early summer it bears tiny red-green, dimerous flowers in conical branched panicles, followed by small, spherical fruit. However, it is primarily cultivated for its massive leaves. Like most Gunneras, it has a symbiotic relationship with certain blue-green algae which provide nitrogen by fixation.

This plant grows best in damp conditions such as near garden ponds, but dislikes winter cold and wet.

Despite the common name "giant rhubarb", this plant is not closely related to true rhubarb. It was named after a Norwegian bishop and naturalist Johan Ernst Gunnerus, who also named and published a description about the basking shark.

It is native to the Serra do Mar mountains of coastal  Santa Catarina and Rio Grande do Sul states,  Brazil, where it is used in traditional medicine for sexually transmitted diseases.

References

External links
 
Gunnera manicata

manicata
Flora of Brazil
Plants described in 1867